This is a list of notable footballers who have played for Palmeiras.

Legends

Others

References

External links
 Palmeiras Official Site 

Palmeiras
 
Association football player non-biographical articles